Fort Yawuh is a jazz album by American pianist and composer Keith Jarrett. Originally released in 1973 by Impulse! Records, it marks the beginning of the label’s relationship with Jarrett. Recorded live at the Village Vanguard on February 24, 1973 by Jarrett's "American Quartet": Dewey Redman on tenor saxophone, Charlie Haden on acoustic bass, Paul Motian on drums, plus percussionist Danny Johnson. The title of the album is an anagram of "Fourth Way," a reference to George Gurdjieff's fourth path of self-awareness.

Background 
At the time the recording was made, Danny Johnson had never worked as a professional musician. In an interview led by Ethan Iverson, bassist Charlie Haden said that Johnson was "a great, great painter, and a great friend, and someone who was at EVERY gig, and one day he suddenly asked to sit in with us at the Village Vanguard. Keith asked, “What do you play?” “Triangle!” said Johnson. Keith said yes and Danny came down with a big oriental rug and sat like a sitar player with his triangle. And that was the night we recorded Fort Yawuh." One year later, Johnson joined the group again on percussion (along with Guilherme Franco) - this time for the studio recording of Treasure Island.

Critical reception 
Reviewing for Creem in 1974, Robert Christgau said that, while side one sounds like cluttered free jazz at first, it is in fact highlighted by the Ornette Coleman-like playing of saxophonist Dewey Redman. He found side two more accessible because of drummer Paul Motian's performance during "De Drums" and the attractive composition of "Still Life Still Life".

In a retrospective review, Allmusic's Qa'id Jacobs wrote, "Fans of Jarrett's avant-garde liberalism will find 'De Drums' to be the track most unlike the other four selections on this album. 'Still Life, Still Life' is more like a ballad in that it's very slow, but it still maintains the structural freedom featured in the 'Fort Yawuh,' '(If the) Misfits (Wear It),' and 'Roads Traveled, Roads Veiled.'"

Writing for the former jazz magazine Jazz.com, in June 2008 Ted Gioia rated 90/100 the track  (If The) Misfits (Wear It) stating that:

Track listing 
All compositions by Keith Jarrett

Side One

Side Two

Extended Release  
The CD box set The Impulse Years: 1973-1974 expands Fort Yawuh to two CDs, including unedited versions of the takes chosen for the LP as well as additional tracks.

Disc One

Disc Two

Personnel 
Keith Jarrett - piano, soprano saxophone, tambourine
Dewey Redman - tenor saxophone, clarinet, musette, maracas
Charlie Haden - bass
Paul Motian - drums, percussion
Danny Johnson - percussion

References

External links 
 

Keith Jarrett live albums
1973 live albums
Impulse! Records live albums
Albums recorded at the Village Vanguard